"Say You Do" was the third single from Janet Jackson's self-titled debut album Janet Jackson (1982). The song was written by René Moore & Angela Winbush.

The specially remixed version of the song appears on CD versions of Jackson's debut album, Janet Jackson, while a shorter, slightly different version appears on vinyl and cassette versions of the album. It peaked at number fifteen on the R&B chart, and eleven on the dance chart. This was her third top 20 R&B and first top 20 dance single. An edited version of the song exists.
For the first time, Jackson included the song on her 2008 "Rock Witchu Tour". Jackson also included the song in her performance at the 2010 Essence Music Festival, held in New Orleans, Louisiana.

Official versions
 Album Version° - 5:20
 Seven Inch Version° - 3:48
 Specially Remixed Version^ - 6:49

°Unavailable on CD
^The "Specially Remixed Version" is actually the version available on any commercial album CD format.
The real "Album Version" mix is only available on the LP & Cassette formats.

Charts

Live performances
Other than a few television appearances at the time of its release, Janet would not perform this song live or on tour until 2008. She included it in the "Pre-Control Medley" section of her "Rock Witchu Tour". Jackson also included the song in her performance at the 2010 Essence Music Festival, held in New Orleans, Louisiana. The song is also used during the DJ intermission on the 2017-2019 State of the World Tour.

References 

1983 singles
Janet Jackson songs
1982 songs
A&M Records singles
Songs written by Angela Winbush
Songs written by René Moore